Greg DiCenzo is a professional baseball coach and former football, soccer, and baseball player at St. Lawrence University. He is the bench coach of the Columbus Clippers of the International League. He was previously the head baseball coach at the College of the Holy Cross from 2008 to 2019.

Early life
DiCenzo attended Duxbury High School where he was a four-year starter on both the varsity soccer and varsity baseball teams, while a two-year member of the varsity basketball team. DiCenzo played for legendary coach Foster Cass.

Upon graduation, DiCenzo enrolled at St. Lawrence University, where he played for the football, men's soccer and baseball teams. In four seasons on the baseball team, he competed as a pitcher, a first-baseman, and an outfielder. Only playing soccer for one season, he played football for four seasons as both a punter and placekicker. He earned three degrees while at St. Lawrence: a Bachelor of Science degree, a master's degree in education, and a master's degree in education administration.

Coaching career
Upon graduation, DiCenzo was named an assistant baseball coach at St. Lawrence. He coached baseball for four seasons at St. Lawrence and was an assistant with the football program for two seasons. After the 2002 baseball season with St. Lawrence, he became the pitching coach for the Northeastern Huskies baseball program, where he served from 2003-2007. On May 22, 2007, he resigned from his position at Northeastern. He also served as the pitching coach for the Falmouth Commodores from 2002-2005 in the Cape Cod Baseball League.

On July 2, 2007, DiCenzo was named the head coach of the Holy Cross Crusaders baseball team.

On January 23, 2020, DiCenzo was named the manager of the Lake County Captains of the Midwest League.

On October 9, 2021, DiCenzo was named the manager of the Scottsdale Scorpions, one of six clubs in Major League Baseball's Arizona Fall League.

DiCenzo was promoted to bench coach of the Guardians' Triple-A affiliate, the Columbus Clippers, on February 7, 2023.

Head coaching record

References

External links
 Holy Cross Crusaders bio

Living people
1975 births
St. Lawrence Saints football players
St. Lawrence Saints men's soccer players
St. Lawrence Saints baseball players
St. Lawrence Saints baseball coaches
Northeastern Huskies baseball coaches
Holy Cross Crusaders baseball coaches
Cape Cod Baseball League coaches
Association footballers not categorized by position
Association football players not categorized by nationality